The 2003 British Grand Prix (formally the LVI Foster's British Grand Prix) was a Formula One motor race held on 20 July 2003 at the Silverstone Circuit, Silverstone, Northamptonshire, England. It was the eleventh round of the 2003 Formula One season. The 60-lap race was won by Rubens Barrichello driving for Ferrari after starting from pole position. Juan Pablo Montoya finished second in a Williams car, and Kimi Räikkönen third driving for McLaren.

Jarno Trulli, driving for Renault, started alongside Barrichello on the front row and led the first eleven laps of the race, until a track invasion by a later-to-be-defrocked priest, who ran along Hangar straight, running opposite to the 280 km/h train of cars, wearing a saffron kilt and waving religious banners. As a result, the vast majority of cars pitted under safety car conditions, which led to the Toyota drivers Cristiano da Matta and Olivier Panis, who had elected not to pit, leading the field until Räikkönen assumed the lead on lap 30 when Da Matta pitted.

Race report 
The race began with Ferrari's Rubens Barrichello on pole, alongside Renault's Jarno Trulli. Kimi Räikkönen of McLaren-Mercedes started from third, while world champion and championship leader Michael Schumacher started from fifth. Barrichello made a poor start, allowing both Trulli and Räikkönen past on an incident-free first lap. Ralf and Michael Schumacher retained their starting positions of fourth and fifth. On the sixth lap, the headrest of David Coulthard dislodged while traversing the first corner (Copse), forcing him to pit for a replacement under safety regulations, and causing a safety car period to allow marshals to clear the track. Upon the resumption of green flag racing, Barrichello closed the gap to Räikkönen before passing him on lap 11. On the following lap, a man invaded the circuit and another safety car period was necessitated. As it was close to the period when the drivers would be making their scheduled pit stops, the vast majority of cars decided to pit under the safety car. The second placed cars from the respective teams were forced to queue up in the pit lane waiting for service, causing them to drop many places. Michael Schumacher, Fernando Alonso and Juan Pablo Montoya were all outside of the top ten. Of the leading contenders, Trulli was in fourth place while both Räikkönen and Ralf Schumacher had jumped Barrichello when in the pits.

The Toyotas of Cristiano da Matta and Olivier Panis – who had opted not to pit – were leading, while Coulthard was in third, having not required a pit stop after his earlier unscheduled headrest replacement. Räikkönen passed Trulli immediately after the restart before clearing team-mate Coulthard on the same lap. Barrichello then passed a slowing Ralf Schumacher on the 17th lap while Räikkönen also passed Panis before chasing down the leading da Matta. Ralf Schumacher was forced to pit after encountering difficulties, while at the same time Michael Schumacher was unable to pass Alonso. By the 26th lap Barrichello was still trying to pass Trulli, and the two leaders continued to extend their lead. Barrichello and Montoya eventually passed Trulli by the end of the 27th lap, before Panis fell victim to both on the 29th. Da Matta eventually ceded the lead after pitting on the 30th lap to Räikkönen. Barrichello then set the fastest lap after being cleared of traffic, taking the lead after Räikkönen pitted for the second time. Barrichello continued to cut the advantage, but Räikkönen regained the lead with a reduced margin following the Brazilian's second stop. After closing in, Barrichello passed Räikkönen after pressuring him into a mistake. Michael Schumacher eventually passed Trulli on the 46th lap, but an unforced error by Räikkönen allowed Montoya to seize second position. In the closing phase of the race, Coulthard passed both da Matta and Trulli to earn fifth place.

Track invasion 

On the 11th lap, as the procession of cars exited the Becketts corner onto the Hangar straight, Neil Horan cleared the fence wearing a kilt, waving banners with statements "Read the bible" and "The Bible is always right" and ran towards the sequence of cars, forcing several cars to swerve to avoid him. He eventually returned to the grass runoff area at the side of the track after the cars had passed for the lap, and was tackled by a track marshal.

He was later charged with aggravated trespass and pleaded guilty in a Northampton court, stating that he took the open gate as a sign from God, although the prosecution contended that his act was premeditated as he had already prepared the banners prior to attending the Grand Prix. He was later jailed for two months.

The incident prompted comparisons to the events at the 1977 South African Grand Prix, where volunteer track marshal, Frederick Jansen van Vuuren, ran across the main straight to aid a car and was hit at 170 mph by Tom Pryce, who couldn't see him until it was too late because of the steep crest on the straight. Both Van Vuuren and Pryce were killed by the impact. A similar incident occurred at the 2000 German Grand Prix when a disgruntled ex-Mercedes employee walked along part of the circuit in protest before being arrested. This caused a safety car, which eliminated the lead of Mika Häkkinen, driving for McLaren Mercedes. Unlike the German protester, Horan ran directly down the middle of the track, and intentionally towards oncoming cars and lurching towards some of them.

The race led to fears that Formula One bosses Max Mosley and Bernie Ecclestone, who had been highly critical of the media and corporate facilities of Silverstone, would use the incident to drop the race from the Formula One calendar, with Ecclestone saying "It wasn't necessary – the race was exciting enough without it. But the security wasn't good enough". However, drivers and team officials defended the circuit, with Montoya stating "This was one of the best races of the year, even with the spectator. It was so much fun today," and Sauber boss Peter Sauber stated "When a man sets himself on fire in the street in Paris, no one blames Paris", while McLaren-Mercedes boss Ron Dennis said "There is no way you can prevent it happening".

Stephen Green, the marshal who handled Horan, was later awarded the BARC Browning Medal for "outstanding bravery in tackling a track invader during the 2003 British Grand Prix at Silverstone", the second recipient after David Purley 31 years previously.

Classification

Qualifying

Race

Notes 
This was Antônio Pizzonia's last race of the season. He was dropped due to a string of poor results, and replaced by Minardi's Justin Wilson, who was himself replaced by Danish driver Nicolas Kiesa at Minardi.

Championship standings after the race 
Bold text indicates who still has a theoretical chance of becoming World Champion.

Drivers' Championship standings

Constructors' Championship standings

Note: Only the top five positions are included for both sets of standings.

References 

British Grand Prix
British Grand Prix
Grand Prix
British Grand Prix